Utah's Hogle Zoo is a  zoo located in Salt Lake City, Utah. It houses animals from diverse ecosystems. It is located at the mouth of Emigration Canyon. Hogle (pronounced "ho-gul") is an accredited member of the Association of Zoos and Aquariums (AZA) and the World Association of Zoos and Aquariums (WAZA).

History
The zoo has been at its present location at the mouth of Emigration Canyon since 1931 on land donated by Mr. and Mrs. James A. Hogle. Its original location was in Salt Lake City's Liberty Park. In 1916, the zoo purchased Princess Alice, an elephant, from a traveling circus. She gave birth to the first elephant born in Utah. His name was Prince Utah and he died at eleven months old. Current exhibits include various birds, mammals, and reptiles from around the world.

The zoo is owned by the city of Salt Lake City and is supported through tax dollars and private donations raised by the Utah Zoological Society.

Affiliations
Hogle Zoo is accredited by the Association for Zoos and Aquariums. Only 10 percent of American zoos are accredited by the AZA. As part of the AZA, Hogle Zoo must abide by strict husbandry, education, and guest service requirements. The AZA has to approve any exhibits the zoo wants to create. It even has to approve the enrichment and food that is given to the animals. All the animals in AZA zoos are technically "owned" by the AZA. Animals are only moved within other AZA zoos.

Most of the animals at Hogle Zoo have a Species Survival Plan, which is run under the AZA and ensures genetic diversity for certain species. The SSP pairs animals together for mating based on their hereditary and gene pool. For example, Nabu and Baron, Hogle Zoo's female and male lions, were paired by the Lion Species Survival Plan. They were given the OK to mate by the SSP, because they had different genes, insuring genetically diverse offspring. This resulted in the birth of the zoo's lion cubs in 2016. The majority of animals with Species Survival Plans are animals that are near the threat of endangerment or near the threat of extinction.

Exhibits

Primate Forest 
The A. LaMar Farnsworth Primate Forest opened to the public in June 1997. The exhibit was named after the former zoo director A. LaMar Farnsworth, who served as director for 33 out of his 45 years at the zoo. The exhibit, which cost $400,000 to construct, replaced the old concrete Monkey Island exhibit. Primate Forest offers lush, naturalistic landscapes for several species of primates including black howler monkeys, eastern black-and-white colobus monkeys, black-handed and brown-headed spider monkeys. The exhibits were specifically designed for each species. The large central exhibit for the colobus monkeys, which is 5,100 square feet and reaches a central height of 18 feet, offers trees where the primates can jump from. Each exhibit also has water features.

Great Ape Building 
The Great Ape Building was constructed around 1965. Today, the exhibit houses western lowland gorillas and Bornean orangutans. The building consists of four indoor habitats with two adjoining outdoor exhibits split between the two species.
	
The gorilla troop is composed of silverback male Husani and females Mary, Pele, and Jabali. In 2020, Jabali gave birth to her daughter Georgia, the first birth for this pair. Adjacent to the gorillas are the habitat for the Bornean orangutans, Mia, Kwawan, Acara, and Tuah. Acara and Tuah were born at the zoo in 2005 and 2014 respectively; however, both were orphaned when their parents died three months apart in 2014. With the untimely death of his mother, Tuah had to be hand-raised by zookeepers. Acara has proved to be an attentive sister and after a lot of work and training, Tuah was placed with Acara full-time in March 2015 so that she could be his surrogate. In 2016, Mia arrived as a future breeding male. In 2021, Kawan arrived on a future breeding recommendation with Mia.

The Great Ape Building was also once home to chimpanzees. The zoo's current master plan anticipates a renovated modern space for the two ape species.

Small Animal Building
The Small Animal Building was built in the 1970s. The building itself features four different ecosystems, including a Tropics Zone, Temperate Zone, Desert Zone, and Rainforest Aviary. Other animal exhibits can be found outside of the Small Animal Building. The building features various reptiles, amphibians, small mammals and birds.

Temperate Zone

The Temperate Zone features animals from temperate climates. A pair of black-footed cats call the Temperate Zone home as well as a North American porcupine and Cape hyraxes. The zoo's critically endangered Siamese crocodiles live in the Temperate Zone during the winter. Other reptiles found in the Temperate Zone include a Madagascar tree boa, crested geckos, and flat-backed spider tortoises.

Desert Zone

In the Desert Zone, guests can see animals found in deserts from all around the world. The Desert Zone has a breeding pair of sand cats as well as burrowing owls and two nine-banded armadillos. Reptiles in the Desert Zone include Gila monsters, rubber boas, and spider tortoises. The Sonoran Desert Exhibit is an aviary that includes birds like white-winged doves, cardinals, and Gila woodpeckers, as well as desert tortoises in the winter.

Tropics Zone

The Tropics Zone features animals from rainforests around the world. In the Tropics Zone, guests can see the zoo's family of titi monkeys, a kinkajou, and a colony of straw-colored fruit bats. A mixed-species exhibit with the zoo's crested porcupines and three female Von der Decken's hornbills is also featured. The zone also features many reptiles including Indian star tortoises, green tree pythons, and a cottonmouth.

Rainforest Atrium

The Rainforest Atrium is a free-flight aviary. Speckled mousebirds, scarlet ibises, roseate spoonbills, superb starlings, and rose-ringed parakeets are just a few of the birds that can be found in the atrium. The Rainforest Atrium is also the winter home for the zoo's Aldabra giant tortoises and radiated tortoises

Elephant Encounter 
Elephant Encounter was completed in 2005 as a replacement to the Animal Giants Complex. Elephant Encounter features three natural outdoor exhibits. The first being a large Serengeti with a swimming channel that spans 10.5 feet deep and holds over 110,000 gallons of water. Guests can then enter the African Lodge, a 2,600 square foot open-air African structure, constructed of wood and thatch materials, which overlooks the Working Yard. Next is the Kopje, a rock structure where guests can get face-to-face to rhinoceros.
	
The Hogle Zoo houses two African bush elephants and two southern white rhinoceros. The elephant herd is made up of mother-daughter pair, Christi and Zuri. Rhino half-siblings, Princess and George, share the habitat next door.

Asian Highlands 
Asian Highlands was opened in 2006 after the old Feline Building was demolished. The $6 million exhibit depicts an Asian Highland Village with various points to view Asian cats. In 2018, a red panda exhibit was added to the front of the exhibit near the Cat Wok Café.
	
Asian Highlands houses a breeding pair of Siberian tigers,  snow leopards, Pallas's cats, red pandas, Amur leopards and Turkmenian markhors. Since 2017, the Amur leopard pair have produced four litters and a total of seven cubs, most recently Jordan and Chelsea on December 25, 2021.

Rocky Shores 
Rocky Shores is an extensive multi-animal habitat featuring bears, sea lions, seals, and otters, anchored by its state-of-the-art polar bear habitat. The exhibit is modeled after a cannery or shipping dock on the northwest coast of the U.S. After opening in 2012, the zoo welcomed back several of its most popular animals. The exhibit replaced the Bear Grotto, completely renovating the west end of the zoo. 
	
The exhibit is home to a breeding pair of polar bears named Neva and Nikita. Next door is a habitat for three orphaned grizzly bear siblings called Koda, Dolly, and Lulu. The three were found in Yellowstone causing trouble without a mother. They were deemed too young to be released in the wild. They were brought to the Hogle Zoo in 2012. Other habitats included California sea lions, harbor seals, North American river otters and rescue bald eagles, Nemo and Betsy.

African Savanna 
In 2014, the Hogle Zoo opened the $16 million African Savanna. The first habitat is a 4.5-acre rolling grassland, dotted with trees, and includes a watering hole. The habitat features reticulated giraffes, Hartmann's mountain zebras, common ostriches, common warthogs, Egyptian geese, and helmeted guineafowl. Guests can get a great view of the savanna from Twiga Terrace. The exhibit also offers a place for guests to feed and interact with the giraffes. The Savanna also has an exhibit called Lion's Hill. The exhibit allows guests to come face to face with the zoo's lion pride. A training fence where guests can watch as keepers feed and train the lions. The whole exhibit is bordered by a train dubbed the Zoofari Express.

News
January 6, 2020: Reticulated giraffe Pogo and her unborn calf succumb to illness after rapid health decline.
March 17, 2020: African lions, Brutus and Titus, are relocated to the Brookfield Zoo in Chicago.
March 17, 2020: The zoo closes temporarily due to COVID-19 concerns.
March 19, 2020: Two Amur leopard cubs are born to Dmitri and Zeya.
April 17, 2020: As a result of lack of funding, the zoo terminates its World of Flight bird show.
May 2, 2020: The zoo becomes one of the first zoos in the United States to reopen following the COVID-19 pandemic. 
May 10, 2020: The zoo announces their western lowland gorilla, Jabali, is pregnant via Facebook.
May 22, 2020: An eastern black-and-white colobus monkey is born to Sefu and Violet.
May 30, 2020: The Hogle Zoo lays off 20 full-time positions and furloughs four full-time employees as a ramification of financial hardships due to the COVID-19 pandemic.
July 6, 2020: A female Western lowland gorilla is born to Husani and Jabali.

Famous animals
The zoo has had many famous animals in its collection since it opened in Liberty Park in 1911.

Princess Alice
Princess Alice, a female Asian elephant, was the zoo's most famous and biggest attraction during the early 1900s. She came to the zoo, which at the time was located in Salt Lake City's Liberty Park, in 1916. Schoolchildren donated nickels and pennies to raise $3,250 to buy Princess Alice from a traveling circus called Sells-Floto Show Company. She was a big hit among Utahns. In 1917, a year after her arrival, the zoo built a building to house her in. Princess was the biggest draw for the small Salt Lake City zoo.

On April 29, 1918, Princess Alice gave birth to a male named Prince Utah. Utahans were thrilled with the news as he was the first elephant to be born in Utah. However, he died a year later on March 14, due to injuries he suffered after his mother rolled over him.

Utahans were upset after Princess Alice repeatedly broke free from her enclosure. This prompted the zoo to relocate. The Hogle family donated 42 acres of land at the mouth of Emigration Canyon in 1931. In July of that year, the zoo built its new elephant building with a safer and larger exhibit for Princess Alice. The building was dedicated to the children of Salt Lake City. The zoo opened later that year on August first. On August 14, 1932, a relief carving of Princess Alice was unveiled. It was donated by J. R. Fox, a local Utah sculptor.

In 1947, Princess Alice went on a rampage throughout the zoo grounds. She ripped up concrete, fountains, and an elm tree. After a few hours, she calmly returned to her exhibit. In 1953, Princess Alice was euthanized after becoming ill at the approximate age of 69. Princess Alice is one of the most famous animals in the zoo's history. She played a vital role in Utah's history as well.

Shasta
Shasta, who was born on May 6, 1948, was one of Hogle Zoo's most famous animals. She was the first liger born in America. Her mother was Daisey, a tiger, and her father was Huey, a lion. The two had been raised together, and that was why the zoo was able to breed them. Shasta weighed just over a pound at birth. However, her mother rejected her, and therefore she was hand raised. Shasta was a huge draw at the zoo. She was the reason for the zoo's success during the mid-1900s. Without her, Hogle Zoo may have gone out of business. Every year, the zoo held birthday parties for her. This drew in large crowds. After she died in 1972, she was sent to a taxidermist to be stuffed. Her body can now be seen at the Monte L. Bean Life Science Museum at Brigham Young University. At 24 years, Shasta holds the world record for the longest-lived liger in history.

Gorgeous
Gorgeous, a female western lowland gorilla, was one of the zoo's most famous animals. Gorgeous came to Hogle Zoo in 1985 from the Cheyenne Mountain Zoo in Colorado. She was caught in the wild in 1949 when she was only an infant. Gorgeous was very popular among guests, as she constantly interacted with them. However, Gorgeous lived alone because she did not get along with other gorillas. Therefore, she never had any offspring. In 1990, Gorgeous became world-famous as she was the first gorilla ever to receive cataract surgery. Dr. Allan Crandall, an ophthalmologist at the University of Utah Medical School, performed the surgery and implanted a lens into Gorgeous's eye. Gorgeous died in 1999 at the age of 50 and was the oldest living female gorilla at the time. She died of age-related problems. Since Gorgeous was popular among guests and staff, a bronze bust of her was made and displayed near the outside ape exhibits. This statue can still be seen today.

Dari
Dari lived to be the oldest living African elephant in the world. She lived to the age of 55 and died due to age-related problems. Dari was loved by guests and staff alike. She was known for her caring attitude toward the other elephants in her herd.

Daphne
Daphne was the oldest living giraffe in the world. She came to Hogle Zoo in 1985 from the San Diego Zoo Safari Park. She had nine calves at the zoo. Daphne died at the age of 31, which is double the average lifespan for giraffes.

Animal escapes
In 2006, Maddi, an eight-year-old female grey wolf, leaped over an eight-foot fence and escaped from her enclosure. She was out of her enclosure for about an hour until zoo officials could secure her and bring her back into her enclosure. No one was hurt in the incident.

In 2016, Zeya, a four-year-old Amur leopard, climbed through a six by six-inch opening at the top of her enclosure. The sixty-pound endangered cat rested on a beam just outside her enclosure and fell asleep. Zeya was tranquilized and put into a holding area in the zoo's hospital.

Ape attacks and escapes
In 1997, Tino, a 450-pound male western lowland gorilla, attacked and bit Robert Pratt, the zoo's team leader for primates. Tino gained access to a room which Pratt was cleaning after a door was left open. Pratt was knocked down by the gorilla and suffered some bite wounds. Pratt returned to work soon after the incident.

In 1999, two zookeepers were attacked by three chimpanzees after a man failed to close the gate to their indoor enclosure. Two chimpanzees were shot and killed and a third was contained and was sent to a zoo in Kansas. Both zookeepers were severely injured.

In 2011, four spider monkeys escaped from the outdoor enclosure. The four primates did not travel far and were coaxed back into their exhibit by zookeepers. No one was harmed in the situation.

Conservation efforts
Conservation efforts at Hogle include a reduce, reuse, recycle program, water conservation, and earth-friendly biodegradable products. This zoo's efforts were recognized in 2005 by the Recycling Coalition of Utah, and it received the Thomas A. Martin Utah Recycler of the Year award for a non-profit business.

Following a June 2010 oil spill from an underground Chevron pipeline in Red Butte Creek, 150 to 200 birds, many of them Canada geese, came in contact with the oil and were taken to Hogle Zoo to be cleaned.

The Big Six Program is the Hogle Zoo's biggest conservation program. The program works with six different organizations that are working with six endangered species. The big six animals that are a part of the program include the African lion, Bornean orangutan, polar bear, African elephant, radiated tortoise, and boreal toad.

Closed exhibits

Bear Grotto 
Bear Grotto was constructed in the late 1950s in the western area of the zoo. The exhibit consisted of two concrete enclosures for the zoo's polar bears. In 1995, Andy, a male polar bear, came to Hogle Zoo from the Buffalo Zoo on a breeding recommendation. In November 1996, Chinook, the zoo's 20-year-old female polar bear, gave birth to twins. Andy was the father. The cubs were named Koluk and Kiska. Visitors were very excited about the birth of the cubs. Guests could not see the cubs, however, until the spring of the next year. On December 12, 2000, Chinook gave birth again to a female cub. Andy had sired the cub. Web-users were able to see two video clips of the mom and her cub. The cub was named Anana. Anana was not out on display until mid-April the following year. In December 2002, Chinook was euthanized because of her failing health. Chinook was 25 years old at the time. In November 2003, Andy died.

In July 2002, Dale, a female black bear, went on display in Bear Grotto. She was an orphan that was rescued from Minnesota. In 2003, Cubby, a male black bear, moved to Hogle Zoo from the Chahinkapa Zoo in North Dakota. Then in 2004, Tuff, a male black bear, came to live at Hogle Zoo. Tuff was born at a private breeder's farm in Missouri. He was then sold illegally. However, he was confiscated by officials and moved to a licensed facility. Tuff moved to Hogle Zoo shortly after. All of the black bears were moved to the Oregon Zoo because Hogle Zoo was going to start construction on their Rocky Shores exhibit.

Cougars 
In the late 1950s, the zoo constructed an exhibit for cougars. Large red cement rocks were made to mimic their natural habitat. The zoo's two cougars were orphaned brothers. Snow leopards were held in the exhibit at some point in time.

Peccaries and tortoises 
Between the cougar exhibit and Bear Grotto, a summer enclosure was built for the zoo's tortoise collection. Kronk and Yzma, the zoo's large Aldabra tortoises, took residence in the exhibit. In 2004, the exhibit was renovated for the arrival of four endangered Chacoan peccaries. The renovated exhibit featured tunnels and dens for the South American pigs.

Penguin Cove 
In 1964, The sea lion pool was built. In 1996 the sea lion pool was renovated to house endangered black-footed penguins. Hogle Zoo had fourteen penguins: Hardy, Gia, Puff, Rocky, Bluebird, Blackbird, Whitebird, Greenbird, Newton, Dancer, Scrappy, Sooty, Flap and Shaker. In 2002, three chicks were born. The exhibit consisted of rocky shoreline, a pool, a nesting area, and an indoor area for the birds. As of 2021, the penguins have been relocated and the Penguin Cove has been remodeled into the “Rocky Shores” exhibit, housing seals, sea lions, polar bears, and other large mammals of the shoreline.

Red pandas 
In 2002, two female red pandas made their debut in the red panda exhibit behind Penguin Cove. The outdoor exhibit featured a large tree for the red pandas to climb and an indoor room for them during hot summer months. The indoor room was visible to guests. The red panda encounter was reopened with the debut of the Asian highland exhibits. This has come to include an outdoor viewing area and an indoor viewing area inside the small animal building.

Llamas 
A group of llamas lived in a large outdoor exhibit next to Penguin Cove. A bridge that went over Emigration Creek, near the red panda enclosure, led guests to the llama viewing. Near the llama viewing, guests could see the indoor penguin exhibit. Before construction on Rocky Shores started, the llamas were moved to the old bighorn sheep exhibit on the south pathway.

Old Savanna 
The savanna exhibit was split into two parts: the savanna and the zebra enclosure. At the bottom of a hill was the actual "savanna". This section included two Cuvier's gazelles, an addax and a springbok. The savanna had two viewing points. One of them looked out onto the savanna, but it did not view the entire savanna. The other viewing point was from on top of an elevated walkway. The walkway was not wheelchair accessible. This viewing point gave you a bird's eye view of the savanna. There were many hiding spots for the animals, so guests were not able to see all the animals.

At the top of the hill was the zebra exhibit. This exhibit featured two Grevy's zebra: Taji and Monty. A gully provided as a natural barrier between the guests and the animals. The zebras had a small water hole in their exhibit. That water hole fed into a waterfall. The waterfall trickled over a ledge into the savanna exhibit below. The zebras were kept at night in around shed. In 2010, both Taji and Monty died unexpectedly. Tests could not give a clear reason why the two zebras died. After the death of Taji and Monty, three ostriches, a father and his two sons, went on display in the old zebra exhibit. Their names were Red, Yellow, and Blue. Two of the same ostriches can be found in the new African Savanna that opened in 2014.

Guinea fowl and two Egyptian geese, Sassy and Yellow, had free range of the north-west end of the zoo. They could often be seen in the zebra or savanna exhibits. More guinea fowl and the same Egyptian geese live in the new African Savanna Exhibit.

Giraffe Building 
In 1969 the unique two-story Giraffe Building was constructed. The giraffe building was not safe. In the early 1990s, two giraffes were euthanized after breaking legs on slippery floors. In 1994, the USDA cited the zoo because it failed to maintain structures in good repair at the Giraffe Building. The zoo was also cited in 1994 after failing to correct previously identified violations of peeling paint that could be ingested by the giraffes. In 2002, Sandile, a 7-year-old male reticulated giraffe, died after getting his neck stuck in a fence. In 2004, Ruth, a 26-year-old female reticulated giraffe, was euthanized after complications of a fractured leg. The zoo could not identify whether the broken leg was related to the building. Several giraffes died at Hogle Zoo, however, not all were building related. The zoo paid in all $50,000 to ensure that the Giraffe Building was USDA approved. After the African Savanna was opened in 2014, all of the zoo's giraffes were moved to a new state-of-art giraffe house. The old Giraffe Building was turned into the zoo's Maintenance Building, and it no longer houses animals.

Feline Building 
The Feline Building, which opened in 1970, consisted of a series of concrete cages for big and small cats. The building housed lions, tigers, jaguars, a serval, an Arabian wildcat, ocelots, sand cats, black-footed cats, and other cats. In 1995, the cages were renovated. Renovations included fabricated trees, rock work, and recirculating water. Murals were added in 1996. The renovations cost $1,400. In 2005, construction started on the Asian Highlands, the renovated Feline Building. Asian Highlands features realistic outdoor habitats for cats of Asia.

Hippo Building 
The Hippo Building was located where the Conservation Carousel is today. It was built in the mid-1970s. The building was home to one male hippo named Moe. Moe had a 30,000-gallon pool. Moe shared the building with a breeding pair of black-footed penguins. On the outside of the building, there were exhibits for the zoo's Siamese crocodiles, Hillary and Bill. The crocodiles were moved to the Small Animal Building in 2003. Moe moved to the Rio Grande Zoo in Albuquerque, New Mexico. The Hippo Building was torn down a couple of years later for the construction of the new carousel.

Animal Giants Complex 
In 1981, for the Hogle Zoo's fiftieth anniversary, the Animal Giants Complex was built. The exhibit was built to house the zoo's elephants, Dari, Kali, Twiggy, Toni, and Toka, and the zoo's white rhinos, Princess and George. Naturalistic outdoor enclosures were not only built for the zoo's pachyderms but for ostriches and tortoises too. The Animal Giants Complex was renovated for Elephant Encounter which opened in 2005.

Central Zone 
Central Zone was in between Desert Canyon and the Great Apes Building. Central Zone was home to the zoo's Bactrian camels. During the summer of 2012, the Gobi, an arthritic male camel, was euthanized due to his great pain. He lived with another camel, named Mabel, who was then sent to the San Diego Zoo to be with other camels and so the zoo could start construction on the African Savanna exhibit.

Discoveryland 
In the late 1980s, construction on Discoveryland began. Discoveryland was the first exhibit built at Hogle Zoo to resemble animals' natural habitats. The exhibit displayed animals of the Americas. The exhibit was constructed in the eastern part of the zoo. It was built in five phases. Discoveryland was torn down in order to build the zoo's African Savanna.

Woodland Edge

Woodland edge was the first phase of Discoveryland. Woodland Edge consisted of two naturalistic exhibits. One exhibit housed the zoo's bald eagles. Their names were Sam and Betsy. The other exhibit housed a bobcat.
When construction on Rocky Shores started, some of the animals from the construction zone had to be moved to Discoveryland. The exhibits in Woodland Edge were renovated to house them. Two orphaned mountain lion siblings moved into where the bobcat used to be, and a family of endangered charcoal peccaries moved into where the bald eagles were. New exhibits were built for the eagles and bobcat on the zoo's south pathway.

Knoll and Burrow

Knoll and Burrow was phase two of Discoveryland. Knoll and Burrow was a very innovative exhibit. The exhibit mimicked a cave on the American prairie. On the outside, visitors could see exhibits for a colony of prairie dogs, a stripped skunk and a rabbit. Inside were exhibits for a cacomistle, short-tailed leaf-nosed bats, a flying squirrel, blind cave fish, and other animals like scorpions. Inside the cave, guests could look through plexiglass to get up-close views of the outside exhibits.

Marsh Aviary

The Marsh Aviary, also known as Woodland Pond, was phase four of Discoveryland. Guests could walk out onto a boardwalk over the pond. In the pond, the zoo kept a group of injured American white pelicans, a breeding pair of mute swans, a greylag goose, and a snow goose. Also in the pond were other North American duck species. Visitors could pay twenty-five cents to feed the birds.

Desert Canyon

Desert Canyon was the fifth and final phase of Discoveryland. Large red stone rocks were constructed of fabricated rock, lath and rebar over three concrete and block buildings. A concrete gun was used to build a reddish-color cement-like compound, which was then hand-troweled for the rock-like appearance. As visitors followed a somewhat narrow path, they saw two exhibits. Originally they were for fennec and kit foxes, but over the years an ocelot and a coati were housed in the exhibits. Next visitors saw an aquarium which housed native Utah fish species like June suckers. On top of a small mesa, angora goats and Navajo sheep lived overlooking an Anasazi cliff dwelling. Before construction on the new African Savanna started, an old angora goat and a few Navajo sheep moved into the old bighorn sheep exhibit on the south pathway. Other small glass exhibits housed Harris antelope squirrels, armadillos, a screech owl, a long-eared owl, an American kestrel, mourning doves, ring-necked pheasants, Bullock's orioles, and ravens. Desert Canyon also housed a small amphitheater. Live animal shows were held there.

Traveling exhibits
The zoo has had many traveling exhibits in its history. Most of them were featured in the zoo's greenhouse, Tropical Gardens.

Tropical Gardens
Tropical Gardens, the zoo's greenhouse, featured several traveling exhibits each summer. Some of the more famous exhibits include Madagascar! (2009), Ghost of the Bayou (2007 and 2008), and Outback Adventure (2002-2004).

Dinosaurs
Hogle Zoo has featured several animated dinosaur exhibitions. The two most recent exhibitions were Zoorasic Park (2011) and Zoorasic Park 2 (2015).

World of the Wild Art Show
Every year during the late winter, the zoo features the World of the Wild Art Show. This indoor exhibition shows animal art by various artists.

Master Plan
Utah's Hogle Zoo is always finding better ways to display animals so that their habitats mimic their natural homes in the wild. In 1998, the zoo began the planning of its ten-year Master Plan. The plan laid out the blueprints for the Main Entrance (1999), the Wildlife Theater (2004), Elephant Encounter (2005), Asia Highlands (2006), and the Conservation Carousel (2008). In 2010, the Master Plan was edited and revised into a thirty-year plan. The edited version laid out the design for African Savanna (2014) and several other future exhibits, discussed below.

Great Ape and Primate Forest Expansion
The Great Ape and Primate Forest Expansion will be the biggest project Hogle Zoo still has to undertake. The project will modernize the exhibit space for the zoo's gorillas, orangutans, and smaller primates. As part of the plan, the zoo hopes to exhibit different species together. For example, the zoo wishes to introduce its colobus monkeys in with the gorilla troop. Another plan combines the zoo's spider and howler monkeys in with other South American species like tapir and capybara. This idea of mixed-species exhibits will not only stimulate the animals, but it will give guests an idea of how these animals live in the wild. Primates and apes travel long distances in the wild. Therefore, another plan for the expansion is to have overhead chutes connect several exhibits to allow the animals to move to different exhibit spaces. This feature would give the animals choice as they would have in the wild. The Great Ape and Primate Forest Expansion will also allow better viewing opportunities for the guests.

Diversity of Life and Education
The Diversity of Life and Education building will be the zoo's new Small Animal Building. Located where the old Beastro and RendeZoo building are today, the new exhibit will feature the animals from the Small Animal Building as well as new small animals. The current Small Animal Building was built in the 1970s and is dated. The new building will have better space for both animals and guests.

The building will be three stories high. The first two stories will be dedicated to animals. The third floor will be used by the education staff. On the south side of the building, there will be a three-story rain forest exhibit featuring free-ranging primates and birds. Other possible exhibits may include a Madagascar exhibit. Funding for the exhibit has already begun and the project is scheduled to be done by 2022.

Flex Exhibit Zone
After the current Small Animal Building is demolished, the zoo will build a new building that will feature traveling exhibits. When the new Beastro restaurant was built in 2014, the Tropical Gardens exhibit, which featured the zoo's traveling exhibits, had to be destroyed. The new building will be bigger than Tropical Gardens. This will allow for larger traveling exhibits

Asia Expansion
The Asia Expansion will include minor renovations to the current Asian Highlands exhibit as well as construction on more exhibits above Asian Highlands. Better exhibits for the zoo's Asian goats as well as exhibits for other Asian species will be a part of the construction. The construction will also include improvements to the South Pathway.

References

External links
 
 

Zoos in Utah
Aquaria in Utah
Buildings and structures in Salt Lake City
Tourist attractions in Salt Lake City
1931 establishments in Utah
Zoos established in 1931